This is the discography of Swedish pop singer Lotta Engberg.

Studio albums 

Solo

As dansband Lotta & Anders Engbergs orkester

As dansband Lotta Engbergs

Joint albums

Compilation albums

Solo compilation albums

Lotta & Anders Engbergs orkester compilation

Lotta Engbergs compilation albums

Kikki, Bettan & Lotta compilation albums

Live albums

Kikki, Bettan & Lotta live albums

Singles 

Solo singles

Singles as Kikki, Bettan & Lotta

Joint singles and featured in

Lotta & Anders Engsbergs orkester
(Svensktoppen songs)
1989: "Melodin"
1989: "Genom vatten och eld"
1989: "En gång till"
1990: "Tusen vackra builder"
1991: "Världens bästa servitris"
1992: "Tusen skäl att stanna"
1992: "Allt jag vill säga"
1993: "Alla lyckliga stunder"

Lotta Engsbergs Svensktoppen songs
(Svensktoppen songs)
1994: "Våra nya vingar"
1994: "Någon"
1995: "Ringen på mitt finger"
1996: "Håll om mig nu"
1996: "Juliette & Jonathan"
1998: "Åh vad jag älskade dig just då"
1998: "Var rädda om kärleken"
1998: "Om jag bara kunde"
1999: "Inget mera regn"
1999: "Tjejer & snubbar, kärringar & gubbar"
1999: "Stanna en stund"
2000: "En liten stund på Jorden"
2000: "Brinner för dej"
2001: "Vilken härlig dag"
2001: "Blå, blå är himmelen" (failed to enter the list)

References 

Discographies of Swedish artists
Pop music discographies